Averna may refer to:

 Amaro Averna, a liqueur
 Averna, another name of the Roman goddess Juno